Perfluorobutane (PFB) is an inert, high-density colorless gas. It is a simple fluorocarbon with a n-butane skeleton and all the hydrogen atoms replaced with fluorine atoms.

Uses
Perfluorobutane can replace Halon 1301 in fire extinguishers, as well as the gas component for newer generation microbubble ultrasound contrast agents. Sonazoid is one such microbubble formulation developed by Amersham Health that uses perfluorobutane for the gas core.

Inhaling perfluorobutane makes one's voice deeper.

Environmental impacts
If perfluorobutane is released to the environment, it will not be broken down in air. It is not expected to be broken down by sunlight. It will move into air from soil and water surfaces. If it is exposed to conditions of extreme heat from misuse, equipment failure, etc., toxic decomposition products including hydrogen fluoride can be produced.

Perfluorobutane has an estimated lifetime greater than 2600 years. Perfluorobutane has a high global warming potential value of 4800. Its ozone depletion potential is zero.

References

Perfluoroalkanes
Fire suppression agents
Dielectric gases